María Dolores del Río Sánchez (born 10 October 1960) is a Mexican politician. From 2009 to 2012 she served as Deputy of the LXI Legislature of the Mexican Congress representing Sonora. She also served as municipal president of Hermosillo from 2003 to 2006. She is now the State Coordinator of Movimiento Ciudadano in Sonora.

See also 
 List of municipal presidents of Hermosillo

References

1960 births
Living people
People from Hermosillo
Politicians from Sonora
Women members of the Chamber of Deputies (Mexico)
National Action Party (Mexico) politicians
Women mayors of places in Mexico
21st-century Mexican politicians
21st-century Mexican women politicians
Municipal presidents in Sonora
Deputies of the LXI Legislature of Mexico
Members of the Chamber of Deputies (Mexico) for Sonora